The annual NCAA Division I Women's Lacrosse Championship tournament has determined the top women's lacrosse team in the NCAA Division I since 1982. The Maryland Terrapins are the most successful team with fourteen titles. The most recent championship was won by North Carolina.

History
Lacrosse was one of twelve women's sports added to the NCAA championship program for the 1981-82 school year, as the NCAA engaged in battle with the AIAW for sole governance of women's collegiate sports. The AIAW continued to conduct its established championship program in the same twelve (and other) sports; however, after a year of dual women's championships, the AIAW held its last championship in 1982 and ceased operation.

Separate championships are held for Division II, founded in 2001, and Division III, founded in 1985.

Results
See Association for Intercollegiate Athletics for Women Champions for the women's lacrosse champions from 1978 to 1982.  NOTE:  In 1982 there were both NCAA and AIAW Division I champions.

Team titles
{{Location map+ | USA Northeast| width=600 | caption='National Championships by school:  14,  7,  3,  2,  1| relief=no | places=
   
   
   
   
   
   
   
   
   
   
   

}}

All-time record
Source: as of end of 2022 championship''
 indicates schools belong to Division II and  indicates a school belongs to Division III.

See also
NCAA Division I Women's Lacrosse Championship bids by school
AIAW Intercollegiate Women's Lacrosse Champions
NCAA Division II Women's Lacrosse Championship (from 2001)
NCAA Division III Women's Lacrosse Championship (from 1985)
NCAA Division I Men's Lacrosse Championship

References

External links
Division I women's lacrosse

Division I
Women's lacrosse competitions in the United States
Women's lacrosse